Yaadein may refer to:

 Yaadein, a 1964 Indian film by Sunil Dutt
 Yaadein (1995 film)
 Yaadein, a 1995 Indian film by Subhash Ghai